Gambaccini is a surname. Notable people with the surname include:

 Louis Gambaccini (1931–2018), American transportation commissioner
 Paul Gambaccini (born 1949), American-British radio personality and author